The Republican Party (PRep) was a Republican Spanish politician party created in 1913 as a re-foundation of the Republican movement, following the disbanding of the Republican Union Party and the splitting of the Radical Republican Party (PRR), the Republican Nationalist Federal Union (UFNR) and the Reformist Party (PRef) from the Republican–Socialist Conjunction.

References

Defunct political parties in Spain
Political parties established in 1913
Political parties disestablished in 1910
Republican parties in Spain
Restoration (Spain)
1913 establishments in Spain
1910 disestablishments in Spain